Asim Raza is a Pakistani film and television commercial director and producer. Asim began his career as an architect and worked with the architectural firm Arshad Shahid Abdullah (PVT) LTD before venturing into film production and direction. He made his debut as a film maker in the mid-90s, he worked in all visual mediums from TV commercials to music videos, long plays and feature films. In 2004, Asim won the Lux Style Award for Best Music Video Director for "Mahi Ve". In 2013, Asim directed a television film, Behadd which won the Hum Award for Best Television Film. Asim marked his feature film debut with a coming-of-age drama  Ho Mann Jahaan, Asim Raza owns a production company called The Vision Factory.

Career

1994–1996: TVCs and music videos
From 1994 onwards, Asim worked on many commercials and videos as a producer/director. He also directed a magazine show for television based on advertising and marketing called The Big Idea. Between 1994 -1996 Asim continued making commercials for big brands like Coca-Cola, Sprite, Lux, Olay, Cadbury, Mobilink, Sunsilk, Pantene, Head and Shoulders, Garnier and many others. He has also worked with musicians from Pakistan such as Junoon, Junaid Jamshed, Najam Sheraz, Abrar-ul-Haq and Hadiqa Kiani.

1997–2012: The Vision Factory and music concerts
 
In 1997, Asim started his production company, The Vision Factory. Under this banner, he made the music video for the single "Sayonee" for the band Junoon. It stayed at no. 1 on both Channel V and MTV Asia for over eight weeks. Asim then attended various short courses, workshops, and seminars including one at the New York Film Academy. On 4 May 1997, Asif Jamal filmed and directed the last concert of Nusrat Fateh Ali Khan, before his death on 17 August 1997, known as "The Pakistan 4 U Concert" aired on Channel V at Karachi Gymkhana. The concert was televised internationally, marking the first ever Pakistani music production which was broadcast beyond South Asia. The concert was made into live album named, "Swan Song-His Final Performance". Following that, Asim filmed the concert performed by Junoon at Central Park, known as "A Tribute to Nusrat Fateh Ali Khan – Junoon Live at Central Park".  Asim also directed the 2nd Lux Style Awards ceremony in 2003 and short documentary about Kathak dance called Raqsan showcasing the talent of Pakistani classical dancer Fasih Ur Rehman. In 2008, he became an external board member on the board of studies for the communication design department at the Indus Valley School of Art and Architecture.

2013–present: Behadd and Ho Mann Jahaan

In 2013, Asim directed a telefilm Behadd, written by Umera Ahmed under MD Productions for Hum TV. Starring Fawad Khan, Nadia Jamil and Sajjal Ali, Behadd premiered 23 February 2013 on Hum TV. The telefilm went on to win Best Television Film award at second Hum Awards ceremony.

Asim marked his directional debut in the film industry with Ho Mann Jahaan, which Sheheryar Munawar Siddiqui co-produced with him. Ho Mann Jahaan is a  coming-of-age drama film, starring Mahira Khan, Sheheryar Munawar Siddiqui, Adeel Hussain and Sonya Jehani The film was released on 1 January 2016. The film opened to great critical reviews and proved to be a huge commercial success at the box office. Ho Mann Jahaan was distributed by ARY Films. Asim also wrote three songs for the Film that were heavily praised by critics. In an interview with The Express Tribune Asim Said, "One should tell a story which is real, relatable and true to life, which is why I opted for a more content-driven film which would touch hearts."

Personal life
Asim Raza is married to Ayla Raza, daughter of former army chief and president of Pakistan Pervez Musharraf. Also an architect by education, Ayla Raza is working for the promotion of traditional performing arts as the director at a not for profit organization,  All Pakistan Music Conference (APMC), Karachi. Together they have two daughters, Maryam Raza and Zainab Raza.

Filmography

Films

Television

Awards

Lux Style Awards

See also

The Vision Factory
Khalil-ur-Rehman Qamar

References

External links

 
 Asim Raza at The Vision Factory  
 

1966 births
Living people
Muhajir people
People from Karachi
Pakistani television commercial directors
Urdu film producers
Pakistani music video directors
Alumni of University College London
National College of Arts alumni
Pakistani film directors
Pakistani film producers
Pakistani television directors
Lux Style Award ceremonies directors
Lux Style Award winners
Pakistani architects